Secret Combination is an album by the American R&B singer Randy Crawford, released in 1981 on Warner Bros. Records.

The album reached No. 12 in the US Billboard Top R&B Albums chart in July 1981, and No. 2 in the UK Albums Chart in January 1982. The singles "You Might Need Somebody" and "Rainy Night in Georgia" reached No. 11 and No. 18 respectively in the UK Singles Chart.

Reception
AllMusic awarded the album with four stars and its review by Ron Wynn states: "Randy Crawford made even more noise on the urban contemporary and R&B front in 1981 with this album, one of her most successful ever from a chart and hit standpoint". In February 1982, Crawford won the award for Best British Female Solo Artist at the 1982 Brit Awards.

Track listing
 "You Might Need Somebody" (Tom Snow, Nan O'Byrne) — 4:17
 "Rainy Night in Georgia" (Tony Joe White) — 4:21
 "That's How Heartaches Are Made" (Ben Raleigh, Bob Halley) — 2:55
 "Two Lives" (Mark T. Jordan) — 3:47
 "You Bring the Sun Out" (Tom Snow, Jessie Dixon) — 3:47
 "Rio de Janeiro Blue" (Richard Torrance, John Haeny) — 4:16
 "Secret Combination" (Tom Snow, Franne Golde) — 3:23
 "When I Lose My Way" (Turley Richards) — 3:43
 "Time for Love" (Leon Russell) — 4:15
 "Trade Winds" (Ralph MacDonald, William Salter) — 4:58

Personnel
Leon Pendarvis – keyboards and arrangements
Abraham Laboriel – bass guitar
Jeff Porcaro – drums
Steve Lukather – guitar
Dean Parks – guitar
Lenny Castro – percussion
Robben Ford – electric guitar on "Two Lives"
Ernie Watts – flute on "Rio de Janeiro Blue"
Neil Larsen – organ on "When I Lose My Way", "Trade Winds" and "Rainy Night in Georgia"
Larry Williams and Bill Reichenbach – horn arrangements on "When I Lose My Way"
Bill Reichenbach – horn arrangements on "You Might Need Somebody"
Horn Section
Larry Williams
Bill Reichenbach
Gary Herbig
Jim Horn
Chuck Findley
Background Vocals
Phyllis St. James
Marti McCall
Petsye Powell
Alphanette Silas

Al Schmitt - engineering, mixing
Don Henderson, Stewart Whitmore  - assistant engineers 
Tommy LiPuma - production
Mike Reese - vinyl mastering
Lee Herschberg - CD mastering

Charts

Certifications

References

1981 albums
Warner Records albums
Randy Crawford albums
albums produced by Tommy LiPuma
Albums recorded at Capitol Studios